KLCC LRT station is an underground rapid transit station in Kuala Lumpur, Malaysia, served by the Kelana Jaya Line.

It is located in the basement of Avenue K, a shopping mall along Jalan Ampang. A pedestrian subway links the station to Suria KLCC and the rest of the KLCC development which includes the Petronas Twin Towers, Maxis Tower and the Kuala Lumpur Convention Centre. Located outside the station, along Jalan Ampang and Jalan P Ramlee, is the KLCC bus hub.

Located right in the middle of the city, and so close to many landmarks, this is one of the busiest stations on the LRT system. It is packed especially on weekends and school holidays.

The pedestrian walkway linking between the Petronas Twin Towers and Pavilion Kuala Lumpur shopping centre in Bukit Bintang was added in January 2012, thus linking this station with the  Raja Chulan Monorail station,  Bukit Bintang Monorail station and  Bukit Bintang MRT station.

Around the station
 AmBank Tower
 Aquaria KLCC
 Avenue K
 ExxonMobil Tower
 KLCC District Cooling
 KLCC Park
 Kuala Lumpur Convention Centre
 Maxis Tower
 Petronas Philharmonic Hall
 Petronas Tower 3
 Petronas Twin Towers
 Suria KLCC

Gallery

External links

Kuala Lumpur MRT & LRT Integrations

Kelana Jaya Line